The women's team pursuit race of the 2013–14 ISU Speed Skating World Cup 6, arranged in the Thialf arena, in Heerenveen, Netherlands, was held on 16 March 2014.

The Dutch team took their fourth consecutive victory for the season, while the Polish team came second, and the Japanese team came third.

Results
The race took place on Sunday, 16 March, in the afternoon session, scheduled at 17:32.

References

Women team pursuit
6